is a former Japanese football player.

Club statistics

References

External links

1982 births
Living people
Chukyo University alumni
Association football people from Fukuoka Prefecture
Japanese footballers
J2 League players
Japan Football League players
Ehime FC players
Kataller Toyama players
Association football forwards